Saturday (세러데이) is a South Korean girl group formed by SD Entertainment in 2018. The group debuted on July 18, 2018, with MMook JJi BBa., the group currently consists Haneul, Juyeon, Yuki, Ayeon and Minseo.

Members

Current
 Haneul (하늘)
 Juyeon (주연)
 Yuki (유키)
 Ayeon (아연)
 Minseo (민서)

Former
 Chaewon (채원)
 Chohee (초희)
 Sion (시온)
 Sunha (선하)

Timeline

Discography

Single albums

Singles

OSTs

References

K-pop music groups
South Korean girl groups
South Korean dance music groups
Musical groups from Seoul
Musical groups established in 2018
2018 establishments in South Korea
South Korean pop music groups